The Pictones were a Gallic tribe dwelling south of the Loire river, in the modern departments of Vendée, Deux-Sèvres and Vienne, during the Iron Age and Roman period.

Name 
They are mentioned as Pictonibus and Pictones by Julius Caesar (mid-1st c. BC), Piktónōn (Πικτόνων) by Strabo (early 1st c. AD), Pictones by Pliny the Elder (1st c. AD), Píktones (Πίκτονες; var. πήκτωνες, πήκτονες, πίκτωνες) by Ptolemy (2nd c. AD), and as Pictonici by Ausonius (4th c. AD). They were also known as Pictavi in an inscription (2nd c. AD), the Notitia Galliarum (4th c. AD) and by Ammianus Marcellinus (4th c. AD).

The city of Poitiers, attested ca. 356 AD as urbis Pictavorum (Pictavis in 400–410, Peitieus [*Pectievs] in 1071–1127), and the region of Poitou, are named after the Gallic tribe.

Geography 

The Pictones dwelled south-east of the Namnetes, west of the Bituriges Cubi, north-west of the Lemovices, and north of the Santones. Initially included in Gallia Celtica, their territory was later integrated into the province of Aquitania.

History

La Tène period
The Pictones minted coins from the end of the 2nd century BC. The tribe was first noted in written sources when encountered by Julius Caesar. Caesar depended on their shipbuilding skills for his fleet on the Loire.  Their chief town Lemonum, the Celtic name of modern-day Poitiers (Poitou), is located on the south bank of the Liger. Ptolemy mentions a second town, Ratiatum (modern Rezé).

The political organization of the region was modeled on the royal Celtic system. Duratios was king of the Pictones during the Roman conquest, but his power waned thanks to the poor skill of his generals. However, the Pictones frequently aided Julius Caesar in naval battles, particularly with the naval victory over the Veneti on the Armorican peninsula.

Roman rule
The Pictones had felt threatened by the migration of the Helvetians toward the territory of the Santones and supported the intervention of Caesar in 58 BC. Though fiercely independent, they and the Santones collaborated with Caesar, especially on the coasts and seas, as late as 55 BC., who noted them as one of the more civilized tribes. Nevertheless, 8000 men were sent to aid Vercingetorix, the chieftain who led the Gaulish rebellion in 52 BC. This act divided the Pictones and the region was the location of a later uprising, especially around Lemonum. This was later quelled by legate Gaius Caninius Rebilus and finally by Caesar himself.

The Pictones benefited from Roman peace, notably through many urban constructions such as aqueducts and temples. A thick wall built in the 2nd century AD encircles the city of Lemonum and is one of the distinguishing architectural forms of Gaulish antiquity. However, the Pictones were not Romanized in depth. Lemonum quickly adopted Christianity in the first two centuries AD.

The region was known for its timber resources and occasionally traded with the Roman province of Transalpine Gaul. Additionally, the Pictones traded with the British Isles from the harbor of Ratiatum (Rezé), which served as an important port linking Gaul and Roman Britain.

See also
 Gaul
 Poitevin (language)
 Roman Republic
 Goffar the Pict, pseudo-historical king of the Pictones

References

Bibliography

Further reading
 
 

 
 
 

Historical Celtic peoples
Tribes of pre-Roman Gaul
Gauls
Tribes involved in the Gallic Wars